Nguruwe was an extinct genus of even-toed ungulates that existed during the Miocene in Africa. It was formerly considered a member of the subfamily Listriodontinae, but has since been placed in Hyotheriinae.

The word "Nguruwe" is the Swahili word for pig.

References

Prehistoric Suidae
Miocene mammals of Africa
Miocene even-toed ungulates
Prehistoric even-toed ungulate genera